A voiceless alveolar affricate is a type of affricate consonant pronounced with the tip or blade of the tongue against the alveolar ridge (gum line) just behind the teeth. This refers to a class of sounds, not a single sound. There are several types with significant perceptual differences:
The voiceless alveolar sibilant affricate  is the most common type, similar to the ts in English cats.
It is found as a regional realization of the sequence  in some Sicilian dialects of Standard Italian.
The voiceless alveolar lateral affricate  is found in certain languages, such as Cherokee, Mexican Spanish, and Nahuatl.
The voiceless alveolar retracted sibilant affricate , also called apico-alveolar or grave, has a weak hushing sound reminiscent of  affricates. One language in which it is found is Basque, where it contrasts with a more conventional non-retracted laminal alveolar affricate.
This article discusses the first two.

Voiceless alveolar sibilant affricate

The voiceless alveolar sibilant affricate is a type of consonantal sound, used in some spoken languages. The voiceless alveolar affricate occurs in many Indo-European languages, such as German, Kashmiri, Marathi,
Pashto, Russian and most other Slavic languages such as Polish and Serbo-Croatian; also, among many others, in Georgian, in Mongolia, and Tibetan Sanskrit, in Japanese, in Mandarin Chinese, and in Cantonese. Some international auxiliary languages, such as Esperanto, Ido and Interlingua also include this sound.

Features
Features of the voiceless alveolar sibilant affricate:

The stop component of this affricate is laminal alveolar, which means it is articulated with the blade of the tongue at the alveolar ridge. For simplicity, this affricate is usually called after the sibilant fricative component.
There are at least three specific variants of the fricative component:
 Dentalized laminal alveolar (commonly called "dental"), which means it is articulated with the tongue blade very close to the upper front teeth, with the tongue tip resting behind lower front teeth.
 Non-retracted alveolar, which means it is articulated with either the tip or the blade of the tongue at the alveolar ridge, termed respectively apical and laminal.
 Retracted alveolar, which means it is articulated with either the tip or the blade of the tongue slightly behind the alveolar ridge, termed respectively apical and laminal.

Occurrence 
The following sections are named after the fricative component.

Variable

Dentalized laminal alveolar

Non-retracted alveolar

Voiceless alveolar non-sibilant affricate

Features

Occurrence

See also
Index of phonetics articles

Notes

References

External links
 

Alveolar consonants
Affricates
Pulmonic consonants
Voiceless oral consonants
Central consonants